Hybolasius viridescens is a species of beetle in the family Cerambycidae. It was described by Henry Walter Bates in 1874. It is known from New Zealand.

References

Hybolasius
Beetles described in 1874